The Khroma Bay (Khromskaya Guba) is a bay in the East Siberian Sea, part of the Sakha Republic (Yakutia) administrative division of the Russian Federation. 

Owing to is northerly location the bay is covered with ice most of the year.

Geography
The bay lies west of the Sundrun River region and east of the Yana Bay. The Omullyakh Bay lies north of the bay and shares the same mouth.

This bay is in the shores of the East Siberian Lowland, an area of wetlands; lakes and marshes dot the whole landscape.

Fauna
Mammoths were common in this region during the holocene period.
In the summer the bay is a breeding and molting area for the lesser white-fronted goose.

References

External links 
Location
Wetlands

Bays of the Sakha Republic
Bays of the East Siberian Sea
East Siberian Lowland